Timber Creek Lodge is a Canadian reality television series that premiered on the Bravo cable network, on December 5, 2016. The show follows a group of staff members serving "a slew of elite clientele at an ultra-luxurious" ski lodge located near the village of Whistler, British Columbia, Canada.

Cast 
 Jamie Murphy, Lodge Manager
 Katy Ann Boyd, Lodge Manager 
 Blake Dubler, Lodgehand
 Colston Villanueva, VIP Mountain Host
 Cynthia Barker, VIP Mountain Host
 Louise Robinson, Head of Housekeeping
 Mark Milburn, Senior VIP Mountain Host
 Jenna Gillund, Housekeeper/Server
 Nikita Williams, Chef

Episodes

References

External links 

 
 
 

2010s American reality television series
2016 American television series debuts
2017 American television series endings
Bravo (American TV network) original programming
English-language television shows